Larré is the name of several communes in France:

Larré, Morbihan, in Brittany
Larré, Orne, in Lower Normandy